Sybilla coemeterii is a species of longhorn beetle in the Cerambycinae subfamily. It was described by Thomson in 1856. It is known from Chile and central Argentina.

References

Bimiini
Beetles described in 1856